

2003

See also
 2003 in Australia
 2003 in Australian television
 List of 2003 box office number-one films in Australia

2003
Australian
Films